Class 360 may refer to:

British Rail Class 360
Fastech 360
GWR 360 Class
Meko 360